Markea epifita is a species of plant in the family Solanaceae. It is endemic to Ecuador.

References

epifita
Endemic flora of Ecuador
Vulnerable plants
Taxonomy articles created by Polbot